5th Multi-member Constituency – Vidin is a constituency whose borders are the same as Vidin Province in Bulgaria.

Background
In the 2009 Bulgarian parliamentary election 5th Multi-member Constituency – Vidin elected 4 members to the Bulgarian National Assembly, 3 of which were through proportionality vote and 1 was through first-past-the-post voting.

Members in the Bulgarian National Assembly
 Through first-past-the-post voting

 Through proportionality vote

Elections
2009 election

 proportionality vote

 first-past-the-post voting

See also
2009 Bulgarian parliamentary election
Politics of Bulgaria
List of Bulgarian Constituencies

References

Electoral divisions in Bulgaria
Vidin Province